Sinai University (Arabic: جامعة سيناء) is a private university in Sinai, Egypt. It was established in 2006. Its president is Professor Hatem Mostafa El-Bolok and the chairman of its board of trustees is the Egyptian businessman Hassan Rateb.

Faculties
It comprises 6 faculties in the Arish campus, which are:
 Faculty of Pharmacy and Pharmaceutical Industries.
 Faculty of Dentistry.
 Faculty of Engineering.
 Faculty of Information Technology and Computer Science.
 Faculty of Business Administration.
 Faculty of Mass Communication.

It also has 7 faculties in Qantara campus:
 Faculty of Pharmacy and Pharmaceutical Industries .
 Faculty of Dentistry.
 Faculty of Engineering (Architecture branch only).
 Faculty of Information Technology and Computer Science.
 Faculty of Business Administration.
 Faculty of Mass Communication.
 Faculty of Physical Therapy.

See also 
 List of universities in Egypt
 List of medical schools in Egypt

References

External links 
 Sinai University (Official website)

Universities in Egypt
Educational institutions established in 2006
2006 establishments in Egypt
Sinai Peninsula